William Keown (1816 – 19 January 1877), known as William Keown-Boyd from 1873, was an Irish Conservative politician.

He was elected as the Member of Parliament (MP) for Downpatrick at a by-election in 1867 and held the seat until the 1874 general election.

References

External links
 

1816 births
1877 deaths
Irish Conservative Party MPs
UK MPs 1865–1868
UK MPs 1868–1874
Members of the Parliament of the United Kingdom for County Down constituencies (1801–1922)